State Route 247 (SR 247) is a state highway in the U.S. state of California. The road passes through the Mojave Desert in San Bernardino County, connecting SR 62 in Yucca Valley to Interstate 15 (I-15) in Barstow. SR 247 was designated by the California State Legislature in 1969; the county roads along that route were given to the state in 1972.

Route description

SR 247 begins at a junction with SR 62 in the town of Yucca Valley, where it is signed as Old Woman Springs Road.  From Yucca Valley, the two-lane highway heads northwestward through desert, much of it through Johnson Valley, briefly passing through Flamingo Heights and the western tip of Landers.

A right turn at this intersection changes SR 247's path due north as Barstow Road towards Barstow and its northern terminus at I-15, passing by Barstow Community College. However, continuing straight on Old Woman Springs Road, instead of turning right at this intersection, leads to SR 18, heading west by northwest to Apple Valley and Victorville.

SR 247 is part of the California Freeway and Expressway System, but is not part of the National Highway System. The route is eligible for the State Scenic Highway System, but it is not officially designated as a scenic highway by the California Department of Transportation. In 2013, SR 247 had an annual average daily traffic (AADT) of 1,700 between Stoddard Wells Road and the Barstow city limits, and 18,000 at the northern terminus with I-15, the latter of which was the highest AADT for the highway.

History
The California State Legislature defined Route 26 as a route from Lucerne Valley to Morongo Valley in 1959. SR 247 was designated in the 1964 state highway renumbering as a route from SR 62 in Yucca Valley to SR 18 near Lucerne Valley, and then from there to I-15 in Barstow. That year, the Lucerne Valley Chamber of Commerce began an effort to have a state highway designated from Lucerne Valley to Yucca Valley along Old Woman Springs Road. By 1969, county roads had been constructed from Barstow to Lucerne Valley, and from there to Yucca Valley. Barstow Road and Old Woman Springs Road were given to the state by San Bernardino County in 1972, although the county had agreed to perform some improvements on the two roads after the state began to maintain them.

In 2001, Caltrans indicated that most of the highway was considered "maintain only" until 2020, except for the portions in Yucca Valley and Barstow, which were to be widened to six lanes.

Major intersections

See also

References

External links

California @ AARoads.com - State Route 247
Caltrans: Route 247 highway conditions
California Highways: SR 247

247
State Route 247
Mojave Desert
Yucca Valley, California
Barstow, California